Miniature inertial measurement unit (MIMU) is an inertial measurement unit (IMU) developed and built by Honeywell International to control and stabilize spacecraft during mission operations. MIMUs can also be configured to perform as an inertial reference unit (IRU). MIMUs have been flown on GEO, Low Earth orbit (LEO), planetary missions and deep-space-probe applications.

Missions

Geostationary (GEO) missions
Spacebus

Low-Earth orbiting (LEO) Missions
Defense Meteorological Satellite Program (DMSP)

Planetary missions
Mars Reconnaissance Orbiter  – launched in 2005 on a mission to study the planet Mars
STEREO – launched in 2006 on a mission to study the Sun
Lunar Reconnaissance Orbiter – launched in 2009 on a mission to study the Moon

Deep-space-probe missions
New Horizons – launched in 2006 on a mission to study the planet Pluto

Notes and references

External links 
Images of Miniature Inertial Measurement Unit (MIMU)
OF SPACE AND TIME – St. Pete Times Story (2006-02-06)
OF SPACE AND TIME – St. Petersburg Times Newspaper Page
Honeywell Satellite Guidance & Attitude Control
Honeywell Miniature Inertial Measurement Unit (MIMU) Specification Brochure

Navigational equipment